Bobbing can refer to multiple things:

 Bobbing, Kent
 Apple bobbing
 Bobbing (boxing) is used to dodge an opponent's punch
 John Erskine, Earl of Mar (1675–1732), Scottish Jacobite known as "Bobbing John"
 Docking, the practice of removing a portion of an animal's ears or tail.